Pao or PAO may refer to:

Fiction 
 Pao-chan, a character from the Japanese magical girl anime television series, Ojamajo Doremi
 Pao, setting of The Languages of Pao, a science fiction novel by Jack Vance
 Pao, a Rebel commando in the film Rogue One: A Star Wars Story

People 
 Pao Ching-yen (also spelled Bao Jingyan), a Chinese anarchist philosopher who presumably lived in the early fourth century C.E.
 Yih-Ho Michael Pao, an American entrepreneur and hydro-engineer
 Pa'O people, an ethnic group in Burma
 Pao language (disambiguation)
 Ellen Pao, American lawyer and former Reddit executive
 Yue-Kong Pao, Hong Kong businessman

Places 
 Barangay Pao, an administrative division of Manaoag, Pangasinan
 PAO, the IATA airport code for Palo Alto Airport, Santa Clara County
 Pao River, a tributary of the Chi River in northeast Thailand
 Pao, Trakan Phuet Phon, Ubon Ratchathani Province, Thailand
 Pão de Açúcar, Alagoas, a municipality located in the Brazilian state of Alagoas
 Paoli station, an Amtrak and SEPTA train station in Paoli, Pennsylvania (Amtrak station code)
 Sugarloaf Mountain, a mountain in Rio de Janeiro, Pão de Açúcar in Portuguese

Technology 
 Process-Architecture-Optimization, the new 3-generation CPU manufacturing process replacing Intel's tick–tock model

Organizations 
 PAO, the ICAO code for Polynesian Airlines
 Panathinaikos A.O., a Greek multisport club
 Panhellenic Liberation Organization, a Greek resistance organization against the Axis occupation of Greece.
 Prince Alfred's Own, a historic name for the Cape Field Artillery
 Public Affairs Office
 Ming Pao, a Chinese newspaper

Science 
 Pao (genus), a genus of pufferfishes
 Pao (unit), an obsolete unit of mass and (especially) dry measure in South Asia
 Phased-array optics
 Pheophorbide a oxygenase, an enzyme
 Pierre Auger Observatory
 Polyalphaolefin, a type of polyolefin made from alpha-olefin monomer(s)
 Polyphosphate-accumulating organism

Other uses 
 Pao (袍), an element of Han Chinese clothing
 Pão de queijo, a Brazilian cheesy bread
 A fairy chess piece
 Nissan Pao, an automobile
PeriAcetabular Osteotomy, a surgery used to correct a condition called hip dysplasia or acetabular dysplasia
 Period-after-opening symbol found on cosmetics products
 Public affairs (military) Officer, or PAO, within the U.S. military
 Person-Action-Object (PAO), a technique often used in memory training and by memory athletes

See also

Pau (disambiguation)
Pav (disambiguation)
Bao (disambiguation)

Language and nationality disambiguation pages